The Westmoreland Museum of American Art is an art museum in Greensburg, Pennsylvania devoted to American art, with a particular concentration on the art of southwestern Pennsylvania.

Art lover Mary Marchand Woods bequeathed her entire estate to establish The Woods Marchand Foundation in 1949. The museum developed from this foundation, opening ten years later.

William H. Gerdts wrote that

A Tim Prentice kinetic sculpture is installed in the south facade.

Selected artists represented in the permanent collection

 Sharif Bey
 Tina Williams Brewer
 Mary Cassatt
 John Singleton Copley
 Stuart Davis
 Thomas Eakins
 Mary Regensburg Feist
 Harriet Whitney Frishmuth
 Vanessa German
 Aaron Harry Gorson
 William Harnett
 Charles Harris (photographer)
 Childe Hassam
 George Hetzel
 Winslow Homer
 Otto Kuhler
 George Luks
 Paul Manship
 Thaddeus Mosley
 Rembrandt Peale
 John Singer Sargent
 Richard Allen Stoner
 Mickalene Thomas
 Benjamin West
 Gilbert Stuart

References

External links

Museums of American art
Art museums and galleries in Pennsylvania
Art museums established in 1959
Museums in Westmoreland County, Pennsylvania
1959 establishments in Pennsylvania
Greensburg, Pennsylvania